Acesulfame potassium (or ), also known as acesulfame K  (K is the symbol for potassium) or Ace K, is a synthetic calorie-free sugar substitute (artificial sweetener) often marketed under the trade names Sunett and Sweet One. In the European Union, it is known under the E number (additive code) E950. It was discovered accidentally in 1967 by German chemist Karl Clauss at Hoechst AG (now Nutrinova). In chemical structure, acesulfame potassium is the potassium salt of 6-methyl-1,2,3-oxathiazine-4(3H)-one 2,2-dioxide. It is a white crystalline powder with molecular formula  and a molecular weight of 201.24 g/mol.

Properties
Acesulfame K is 200 times sweeter than sucrose (common sugar), as sweet as aspartame, about two-thirds as sweet as saccharin, and one-third as sweet as sucralose. Like saccharin, it has a slightly bitter aftertaste, especially at high concentrations. Kraft Foods patented the use of sodium ferulate to mask acesulfame's aftertaste. Acesulfame K is often blended with other sweeteners (usually sucralose or aspartame). These blends are reputed to give a more sucrose-like taste whereby each sweetener masks the other's aftertaste, or exhibits a synergistic effect by which the blend is sweeter than its components. Acesulfame potassium has a smaller particle size than sucrose, allowing for its mixtures with other sweeteners to be more uniform.

Unlike aspartame, acesulfame K is stable under heat, even under moderately acidic or basic conditions, allowing it to be used as a food additive in baking, or in products that require a long shelf life. Although acesulfame potassium has a stable shelf life, it can eventually degrade to acetoacetamide, which is toxic in high doses. In carbonated drinks, it is almost always used in conjunction with another sweetener, such as aspartame or sucralose. It is also used as a sweetener in protein shakes and pharmaceutical products, especially chewable and liquid medications, where it can make the active ingredients more palatable. The acceptable daily intake of acesulfame potassium is listed as 15 mg/kg/day.

Acesulfame potassium is widely used in the human diet and excreted by the kidneys. It thus has been used by researchers as a marker to estimate to what degree swimming pools are contaminated by urine.

Other names for acesulfame K are potassium acesulfamate, potassium salt of 6-methyl-1,2,3-oxothiazin-4(3H)-one-2,3-dioxide, and potassium 6-methyl-1,2,3-oxathiazine-4(3H)-one-3-ate-2,2-dioxide.

Effect on body weight 
Acesulfame potassium provides a sweet taste with no caloric value. There is no high-quality evidence that using acesulfame potassium as a sweetener affects body weight or body mass index (BMI).

Discovery
Acesulfame potassium was developed after the accidental discovery of a similar compound (5,6-dimethyl-1,2,3-oxathiazin-4(3H)-one 2,2-dioxide) in 1967 by Karl Clauss and Harald Jensen at Hoechst AG. After accidentally dipping his fingers into the chemicals with which he was working, Clauss licked them to pick up a piece of paper. Clauss is the inventor listed on a United States patent issued in 1975 to the assignee Hoechst Aktiengesellschaft for one process of manufacturing acesulfame potassium. Subsequent research showed a number of compounds with the same basic ring structure had varying levels of sweetness. 6-methyl-1,2,3-oxathiazine-4(3H)-one 2,2-dioxide had particularly favourable taste characteristics and was relatively easy to synthesize, so it was singled out for further research, and received its generic name (acesulfame-K) from the World Health Organization in 1978. Acesulfame potassium first received approval for table top use in the United States in 1988.

Safety
As with other artificial sweeteners, concern exists over the safety of acesulfame potassium.  However, the United States Food and Drug Administration (FDA) has approved its general use. One author claims that studies performed in the 1970's on acesulfame potassium are not adequate to rule out the substance being carcinogenic, but claims it is a carcinogen have been dismissed by the European Food Safety Authority and FDA.

Environment Canada tested the water from the Grand River at 23 sites between its headwaters and where it flows into Lake Erie. The results suggest that acesulfame appears in far higher concentrations than saccharin or sucralose at the various test sites. More recently the environmental fate and effects of acesulfame potassium have been reviewed by Belton et al. (2020).

Compendial status 

 British Pharmacopoeia: Concerns raised regarding the growing presence and potential aquatic toxicity of ACE-K led to this review. The paper compiles previous studies as well as new empirical environmental monitoring, environmental fate, and ecotoxicity data on this artificial sweetener. The biodegradation of ACE‐K is predicted to be low, based on quantitative structure activity relationship (QSAR) models. This has been confirmed by several investigations, mostly published prior to 2014. More recently, there appears to be an interesting paradigm shift with several reports of enhanced ability of wastewater treatment plants to biodegrade ACE‐K. Some studies report that ACE‐K can be photodegraded into potentially toxic breakdown products, whereas other data indicate that this may not be the case. A robust set of acute and chronic ecotoxicity studies in fish, invertebrates, and freshwater plants provided critical data on ACE‐K's aquatic toxicity for this review. A survey of worldwide monitoring data for ACE-K confirmed its detection in wastewater and surface water, generally in the lower parts per billion range, whereas concentrations in sludge and groundwater are much lower (parts per trillion). The highest average concentrations were detected in influents 22.9 μg/L, and effluents 29.9 μg/L. iSTREEM and E-FAST probabilistic exposure models using ACE-K usage loadings to the environment to predict ACE-K concentrations in rivers and streams in the United States confirmed the empirical monitoring data. A regional exposure index was developed that suggests that ACE-K concentrations in other countries were comparable to North America and therefore the model can be reasonably extrapolated worldwide. This environmental risk assessment established that ACE‐K has high margins of safety and presents a negligible risk to the aquatic environment based on extensive ACE‐K environmental monitoring, conservative predicted environmental concentrations, and predicted no‐effect concentration (PNEC) estimates, and a circumspect probabilistic exposure modeling.

References

External links

Joint FAO/WHO Expert Committee on Food Additives evaluation monograph of Acesulfame Potassium 
FDA approval of Acesulfame Potassium
FDA approval of Acesulfame Potassium as a General Purpose Sweetener in Food
 Elmhurst College, Illinois Virtual ChemBook Acesulfame K
 Discovery News Sweeteners Linger in Groundwater

Excipients
Food science
Oxathiazines
Potassium compounds
Sulfamates
Sugar substitutes
E-number additives